Starting on 2 December 2022, a series of intensified clashes broke out of the frontlines of the 'Idlib de-escalation zone' situated in the governorates of Idlib, Aleppo, Hama and Latakia. The clashes began in the form of inghimasi, infiltration and sniper attacks by Hayat Tahrir al-Sham (HTS) and allied militant groups on Syrian Army positions.

According to the SOHR the attacks by HTS are an effort to hamper potential peace talks between Turkey and Syria, and HTS was launching a campaign of attacks as a way of rejecting any deal made on the 'de-escalation zone' in Idlib.

Timeline of clashes

December
On 2 December, a Syrian soldier was shot dead during a HTS sniping attack in the western Aleppo countryside. On 3 December, a Syrian army lieutenant was shot dead in by a HTS sniper in the southern Idlib countryside. Between 6-7 December, 2 Syrian soldiers and a fighter of HTS were killed in clashes on the Idlib frontline, following a Syrian Army infiltration attack on a HTS position in the Al-Ghab Plain. 

On 11 December, clashes broke out after Syrian Army forces advanced on the village of Urum al-Sughra in the western Aleppo countryside. While at least 2 Syrian soldiers were killed in an Inghimasi attack by Tahrir al-Sham militants on a Syrian Army position on the outskirts of the village of Dadikh on the Idlib frontline. The position was destroyed by HTS fighters after the attack. Furthermore, HTS attacked Syrian military positions at Al-Bayda village in the Turkmen mountains on the Latakia/Idlib frontline, killing 3 Syrian soldiers.

On 14 December, a Syrian soldier was shot dead by HTS snipers on the Saraqib frontline. On 17 December, heavy clashes took place on the western Aleppo and Latakia frontlines, including heavy artillery bombardments and heavy machine gun fire. The clashes left one Syrian soldier dead.

On 18 December, at least 3 Syrian soldiers were killed in a HTS infiltration on Syrian positions near the village of Arbikh near Taftanaz, north of Saraqib on the Idlib frontline. HTS released footage of the attack the same day. HTS also launched an infiltration operation on a Syrian military position in the town of Qubtan Al-Jabal in the western Aleppo countryside, killing at least 3 Syrian soldiers and then blowing up the building Syrian forces had been occupying. Footage of the attack was released by HTS.

On 20 December, a Syrian army lieutenant was killed after Syrian forces attempted to infiltrate HTS positions on the Bastaron frontline in the western countryside of Aleppo. A Syrian soldier was furthermore killed on the Al-Ghab frontline in the northwestern Hama governorate. 

On 22 December, heavy clashes were reported on the Al-Fatirah, Maarat Moukhs, Al-Fatera frontlines in the southern Idlib countryside. 7 Syrian soldiers and 3 HTS fighters were killed in the clashes. 

On 23 December, 2 Syrian soldiers were shot dead by HTS thermal snipers on the Saraqib frontline. 

On 24 December, forces of HTS and Ahrar al-Sham launched a sniping operation on the Maarat Muzhas frontline, south of Idlib. 2 Syrian soldiers were killed in the operation. 

Between 25-29 December 3 Syrian soldiers and a civilian were killed in clashes on the frontline. 

On 30 December, HTS targeted Hezbollah vehicle with an ATGM, killing 2 soldiers and a Hezbollah commander.

January
Between 10–11 January, 12 Syrian soldiers and 3 HTS militants were killed in three separate HTS inghimasi attack on Syrian Army positions on the Bastrun frontline in the western Aleppo countryside, and Jabal Zawiya in southern Idlib countryside.

On 14 January, HTS launched an inghimasi attack on Syrian Army positions on the Nahshaba frontline in the Latakia countryside. 4 Syrian soldiers were killed and 2 others were injured in the attack. On the same day, a HTS militant was killed after Syrian Army forces launched an infiltration attempt on HTS positions on the Al-Nayrab frontline, west of Aleppo. 

On 16 January, a Syrian Army lieutenant was shot dead by a sniper of the opposition Coastal Division on the northern Latakia frontline. On the same day, a jihadist and French citizen by the name of 'Abu Hamza' was killed in an infiltration attack by Syrian forces on HTS position on the Jabal Zawiya frontline.

On 16 January, militants of the al-Qaeda affiliated Ansar al-Tawhid launched a suicide attack on Syrian Army positions on the Maarat Muzhas frontline, south of Idlib. 2 Ansar al-Tawhid militants were killed in the attack. On the same day, a civilian was killed by Syrian rocket fire on the Al-Bara frontline.

On 17 January, a Syrian soldier was shot dead by a HTS sniper on the Saraqib frontline east of Idlib.

On 18 January, HTS launched an attack on Syrian Military positions on the Urum al-Kubra frontline in the western countryside of Aleppo, leading to violent clashes between both sides. At least 5 Syrian soldiers and 3 HTS militants were killed in the clashes. Meanwhile in the northwestern Hama region, a member of the Tiger Forces was killed by an HTS sniper.

On 22 January, a civilian and a Syrian soldier were killed in clashes on the frontline in the western Aleppo countryside.

On 23 January, a Syrian soldier was shot dead by a HTS sniper on the frontline near Nayrab, east of Idlib city. On the same day, 2 HTS fighters were killed and 4 others were wounded after Syrian Army forces shelled HTS positions with heavy artillery on the Kafr Nouran frontline in the western Aleppo countryside.

On 24 January, Ahrar al-Sham militants launched an attack on Syrian army forces on the Al-Tufahiyah frontline in the Latakia countryside. At least 3 Syrian soldiers were killed in the attack.Also, a HTS militant died of wounds sustained in clashes with Syrian forces on the Sheikh Suleiman frontline in the Aleppo countryside.

On 26 January, 2 Syrian soldiers were shot dead during a HTS sniping operation on the Dadikh frontline east of Idlib.

On 28 January, a Syrian soldier was shot dead by a HTS sniper on the Maarat Mokhas frontline in the southern Idlib countryside.

On 30 January, two HTS fighters and two Syrian soldiers were killed in exchanges of artillery fire on the western Aleppo frontline.

February
On 1 February, eight Syrian soldiers including a major were killed, after HTS rockets hit one of the military headquarters of the government forces near the town of Kafr Rumah. Three Syrian soldiers were killed later in the day by HTS sniper attacks, near the town of Kafr Nabl.

On 2 February, Turkish defence minister, Hulusi Akar announced the defence ministries of Turkey, Syrian and Russia will hold a meeting in Moscow in the next few days to try and agree to a rapprochement and normalisation of relations between Syria and Turkey. 

On 3 February, a Syrian soldier was shot dead by a HTS sniper on the Saraqib frontiline. In the northern Latakia countryside, seven Syrian soldiers and six HTS fighters were killed during an HTS attack on government positions.

On 5 February, one HTS fighter and one Syrian soldier were killed in exchanges of rocket and artillery fire on the Idlib frontline.

Clashes reduced in the aftermath of the 2023 Turkey–Syria earthquake.

On 9 February, 2 Syrian soldiers were killed in a HTS sniping campaign on the Kabani frontline in the Latakia countryside.

On 18 February, a Syrian soldiers was killed in clashes on the western Aleppo countryside.

On 22 February, 2 Syrian soldiers were killed in a HTS sniping campaign on the Afs frontline in the southern Idlib countryside.

On 25 February, a HTS fighter was killed and another was wounded after Syrian army forces fired a missile at a HTS vehicle in Fuleyfel village in the southern Idlib countryside.

On 28 February, a Syrian soldier was killed by in a HTS attack on Syrian positions on the Latakia frontline.

March

Between 1-2 March, two Syrian soldiers and a fighter of Ahrar al-Sham were killed in clashes on the Al-Ghab Plain and Jabal al Turkmen areas of the frontline.

Between March 4-5, 3 Syrian soldiers were killed by a HTS sniper attacks on the Saraqib frontline and Atarib frontline, in the Idlib countryside.

Between March 11-12, 2 Syrian soldiers and a fighter of HTS were killed in clashes in Western Aleppo countryside.

In the evening on 16 March, HTS forces launched an inghimasi attack on Syrian positions on the frontline near al-Fatatira village in the Southern Idlib countryside. At least 5 Syrian soldiers were killed and another 6 were injured. This was the first HTS inghimasi attack since the recent earthquake.

On 17 March, 2 Syrian soldiers were killed in a HTS infiltration operation on the Nahshaba frontline, in the Latakia countryside.

References 

Aleppo Governorate in the Syrian civil war
Conflicts in 2022
Hama Governorate in the Syrian civil war
Idlib Governorate in the Syrian civil war
Latakia Governorate in the Syrian civil war
2023 in the Syrian civil war
2022 in the Syrian civil war